Death's Deputy is a  fantasy novel by author L. Ron Hubbard.

Death's Deputy was first published in book form in 1948 by Fantasy Publishing Company, Inc. in an edition of 700 copies. The novel originally appeared in the February 1940 issue of the magazine Unknown.

Plot introduction
An air force pilot is unnaturally accident-prone and seemingly cannot be killed.

Publication history
1940, US, Unknown
1951, France, Hachette Livre, hardcover, as Le Bras de la mort
1954, Italy, Urania 37, hardcover, as L'uomo che no poteva morire
1971, US, Leisure Books , paperback

References

1948 American novels
American fantasy novels
English-language novels
Novels by L. Ron Hubbard
Novels about death
Works originally published in Unknown (magazine)
Fantasy Publishing Company, Inc. books